Tadborgaon is a village in Manwath taluka of Parbhani district in Indian state of Maharashtra.

Demography
According to the 2011 census of India, Tadborgaon had a population of 2928, of which 1535 were male and 1393 were female. The average sex ratio of the village was 907, which was lower than the Maharashtra state average of 929. The literacy rate was 75.76% compared to 82.3% for the state. Male literacy rate was 84% while female literacy rate was 65%.

Geography and Transport
Following table shows distance of Tadborgaon from some of major cities.

References

Villages in Parbhani district